James O'Donnell (December 3, 1912 – December 26, 1984) was an American professional basketball player. He played for the Buffalo Bisons in the National Basketball League for eight games during the 1937–38 season and averaged 1.3 points per game.

Jim was the older brother of Neil O'Donnell, who also played on the Bisons in 1937–38.

References

1912 births
1984 deaths
American men's basketball players
American military personnel of World War II
Basketball players from Buffalo, New York
Buffalo Bisons (NBL) players
Canisius Golden Griffins men's basketball players
Centers (basketball)
Forwards (basketball)